Hugo Contardo Emilio D'Atri (31 July 1925 – 21 August 2009) was an Argentine weightlifter. He competed in the men's lightweight event at the 1948 Summer Olympics.

References

External links
 

1925 births
2009 deaths
Argentine male weightlifters
Olympic weightlifters of Argentina
Weightlifters at the 1948 Summer Olympics
Place of birth missing
Pan American Games medalists in weightlifting
Pan American Games bronze medalists for Argentina
Weightlifters at the 1951 Pan American Games
20th-century Argentine people
21st-century Argentine people